Jennie Ferris Bodwell Cave (November 25, 1902 – June 3, 2001) was the first woman to be elected mayor of Norwalk, Connecticut in the city's history. She ran several times, and served one term.

Legacy 
The Common Council Chambers in City Hall is named for her.

References 

1902 births
2001 deaths
Women mayors of places in Connecticut
Connecticut city council members
Connecticut Democrats
Connecticut Independents
Mayors of Norwalk, Connecticut
Skidmore College alumni
Women city councillors in Connecticut
20th-century American politicians
20th-century American women politicians